Manuel Nieto Sánchez (born 29 March 1998) is a Spanish footballer who plays as a forward for CD Eldense, on loan from FC Andorra.

Club career
Nieto was born in Villa del Río, Córdoba, Andalusia, and joined Real Betis' youth setup in 2014, from Séneca CF. He made his senior debut with the reserves at the age of 17 on 27 September 2015, starting in a 0–1 Segunda División B away loss against UD Melilla.

Nieto scored his first senior goal on 2 October 2016, netting the fifth of a 5–0 home routing of CD San Roque de Lepe in the Tercera División. On 31 January 2018, after featuring sparingly, he was loaned to fourth division side CD Alcalá for the remainder of the season.

Upon returning, Nieto started to feature more regularly for the B-side before signing a two-year contract with Cádiz CF on 30 August 2019; he was assigned to the B-team in the third tier. On 17 January 2021, he renewed his contract until 2023.

Nieto made his first team – and La Liga – debut on 23 January 2021, coming on as a late substitute for Anthony Lozano in a 0–3 loss at Sevilla FC. On 28 June, he was loaned to Primera División RFEF side FC Andorra, for one year.

On 9 July 2022, after contributing with Andorra's first-ever promotion to Segunda División, Nieto signed a permanent two-year contract with the club. On 14 August, however, he was loaned to CD Eldense in the third division.

References

External links
 
 
 

1998 births
Living people
Sportspeople from the Province of Córdoba (Spain)
Spanish footballers
Footballers from Andalusia
Association football forwards
La Liga players
Primera Federación players
Segunda División B players
Tercera División players
Betis Deportivo Balompié footballers
CD Alcalá players
Cádiz CF B players
Cádiz CF players
FC Andorra players
CD Eldense footballers